Yanagiwara Sukeakira (柳原 資明, 1297－1353) was a Japanese nobleman (kugyō) of the late Kamakura and early Nanboku-chō period. He is the founder of the Yanagiwara family.

Life 
Hino Sukeakira was born as the fourth son of Gon-Dainagon Hino Toshimitsu.

When the shogun Ashikaga Takauji rebelled against the Kenmu Restoration, he supported Emperor Go-Daigo of the Southern Court. His elder brother Hino Suketomo was one of the masterminds of Emperor Go-Daigo's plan to overthrow the Ashikaga shogunate.

However, with his eldest brother Hino Sukena being a favorite of Emperor Kōgon of the Northern Court, Sukeakira began his service to the Northern Court. When the Ashikaga shogunate fought against the Kenmu Restoration to support the Northern Court, Sukeakira protected Emperor Kōgon as one of the emperor's close associates. He became a senior statesman for the Northern Court building up his power rising to the court rank of Senior Second Rank and to the position of Gon-Dainagon.

He later moved to live at the Yanagiwara Mansion, from which he took the name Yanagiwara from, and established the Yanagiwara family.

Sukeakira died in 1353 (2nd year of Bunna, 7th month, 27th day) at the age of 57.

Genealogy 
The Hino family descended from the Fujiwara clan's Hokke house through Fujiwara no Manatsu, the elder brother of Fujiwara no Fuyutsugu.

The descendants of Sukeakira are of the Yanagiwara family, who made writing the family business. Members of the family exceled in kidendō (the academic study of poetry) and were appointed bunshō-hakase (kidendō teachers). After the Meiji Restoration, the family was appointed to the kazoku (hereditary peerage) with the title of Count.

Family 

 Father: Hino Toshimitsu
 Mother: Sanmi-no-Tsubone (Emperor Kameyama's court lady)
 Wife: Minamoto no Yasuyo's daughter
 Unknown mother:
 Son: Yanagiwara Munemitsu
 Son: Mushanokōji Takamitsu (founder of the Mushanokōji family)
 Son: Tsuchimikado Yasumitsu (founder of the Tsuchimikado family)
 Son: Yanagiwara Tadamitsu (1334–1379, 2nd head of the Yanagiwara family)
 Son: Kōsai

References 

1297 births
1353 deaths
People of Kamakura-period Japan
People of Nanboku-chō-period Japan
Japanese nobility